HLA-A19 (A19) is a broad antigen HLA-A serotype that may recognize the A29, A30, A31, A32, A33, and A74 serotypes. While these haplotypes are found all over the globe their combined frequencies are higher in Sub Saharan Africa, frequencies tend to decline away from Africa.

References

1